Walls Have Ears is a Sonic Youth bootleg live recording from 1985. It was released on 2x12" vinyl in 1986 without the consent of the band.

Content 
Tracks 1-7 were recorded live on October 30, 1985 in London. Track 8 was recorded live on November 8, 1985 at Brighton Beach in Brighton. Tracks 9-17 were recorded live April 28, 1985 in London.

The April tracks were recorded with members Thurston Moore, Lee Ranaldo, Kim Gordon and Bob Bert. The remainder featured new drummer Steve Shelley replacing Bert.

Track listing 
 "C.B."
 "Green Love" ("Green Light")
 "Brother James"
 "Kill Yr. Idols"
 "I Love Her All the Time"
 "Expressway to Yr. Skull"
 "Spahn Ranch Dance" ("Death Valley '69")
 "Blood on Brighton Beach" ("Making the Nature Scene")
 "Burning Spear"
 "Death Valley '69"
 "Speed JAMC"
 "Ghost Bitch"
 "I'm Insane" (unlisted)
 "The World Looks Red"
 "The Word (E.V.O.L.)" ("Flower")
 "Brother Jam-Z" ("Brother James")
 "Killed & Kicked Off" ("Kill Yr. Idols")

Response

Critics 
In his book Psychic Confusion: The Sonic Youth Story, author Stevie Chick wrote, "[A case is made] that the best illicit releases prove that artists sometimes aren't the best judges of their own artistic output. The Walls Have Ears is such an album; unloved by its creators, but a crucial and electrifying document of the group at their live best, playing with violent and ecstatic abandon".

The band 
According to Moore, "Our creative control was put on the spot by this guy. We were kinda livid".

References

External links 

 Sonic Youth Discography (Bootleg Section)

1998 live albums
Sonic Youth live albums